Henry Crown Space Center opened in 1986. The space center includes artifacts and interactive exhibits about space travel. Located in the Chicago Museum of Science and Industry the Henry Crown Space Center includes the Apollo 8 spacecraft and Aurora 7 capsule.

Exhibits
Interactive docking simulation with a replica of the International Space Station.
Remote control Mars Rover
Apollo 8 spacecraft
Aurora 7 capsule
Jet-packs that astronauts wear
Lunar module used for Apollo 11 training

History
The museum was established with a donation from philanthropist Henry Crown. Crown was a billionaire who built General Dynamics. General Dynamics also played a role in Aerospace.

The space center opened with a visit from James Lovell in 1986. The cost of the Space center was 12 million dollars. The museum of Science and Industry in Chicago also opened an OmniMax theater in 1986: it was built inside the space center.

References

External links
Henry Crown Space Center
 "Aviation: From Sand Dunes to Sonic Booms", a National Park Service Discover Our Shared Heritage travel itinerary
 A Field Guide to American Spacecraft
 Documentary of the U.S. Space Program  in Florida

Museums in Chicago
Landmarks in Chicago
Hyde Park, Chicago
Science museums in Illinois
Industry museums in Illinois
Technology museums in Illinois
World's Columbian Exposition
World's fair architecture in Chicago
Museums established in 1986
Association of Science-Technology Centers member institutions
NASA groups, organizations, and centers
Aerospace museums in Illinois
IMAX venues